Raja Anand Singh (born at Lucknow, Uttar Pradesh, 4 January 1939) was member of 5th Lok Sabha from Gonda (Lok Sabha constituency) in Uttar Pradesh State, India.

He was elected to 7th, 8th and 9th Lok Sabha from Gonda (Lok Sabha constituency).

He is the Present head of the royal family of Mankapur Raj (Taluk) from 1963 - present.

References

1936 births
Politicians from Lucknow
People from Hardoi district
India MPs 1980–1984
India MPs 1984–1989
India MPs 1989–1991
India MPs 1971–1977
Lok Sabha members from Uttar Pradesh
Living people
Indian National Congress politicians from Uttar Pradesh